Luis Morgan Casey (June 23, 1935 – July 27, 2022) was an American prelate of the Roman Catholic Church bishop who served as an auxiliary bishop of the Archdiocese of La Paz in Bolivia.  He also served as the vicar apostolic to the Catholic mission in the Pando Department in Bolivia.

Biography
Born in Portageville, Missouri, Casey was ordained a priest by Cardinal Joseph Ritter for the Archdiocese of Saint Louis on April 7, 1962.  In 1965, Casey went to Bolivia to serve in an archdiocesan mission at the headwaters of the Amazon River.

On November 3, 1983, Casey was appointed titular bishop of Mirbiarca and auxiliary bishop of the Archdiocese of La Paz.  He was consecrated in La Paz on January 28, 1984 by Archbishop Alfio Rapisarda, the apostolic nuncio to Bolivia. On January 18, 1988, Casey was appointed vicar apostolic of Pando.   Casey retired as vicar apostolic on February 2, 2013, returning to St. Louis.

In 2019, Casey commented on a recent Synod of the Amazon that was held by the Holy See. He criticized the participants for not addressing the deforestation and other environmental damage being inflicted on the Amazon Basin by mining and farming interests.

References

1935 births
2022 deaths
People from Portageville, Missouri
American expatriate Roman Catholic bishops in South America
20th-century Roman Catholic bishops in Bolivia
Roman Catholic Archdiocese of St. Louis
Religious leaders from Missouri
Catholics from Missouri
21st-century Roman Catholic bishops in Bolivia
20th-century American clergy
21st-century American clergy
Roman Catholic bishops of La Paz
Roman Catholic bishops of Pando